Barbara of Brandenburg (10 August 1527 – Brzeg, 2 January 1595), was a German princess member of the House of Hohenzollern She was a Margravine of Brandenburg by birth and by marriage a Duchess of Brieg (Brzeg).

She was the second child but eldest daughter of Joachim II Hector, Elector of Brandenburg, by his first wife Magdalena, daughter of George, Duke of Saxony.

Life
In 1537 Barbara was betrothed to George (later George II the Pious), second son of Duke Frederick II of Legnica as a part of the alliance signed between her father and Frederick II. The wedding took place eight years later, on 15 February 1545 in her homeland, Berlin. In the same ceremony, was also performed the marriage of her brother John George with Frederick II's daughter, Sophie. As a dowry, Barbara received the amount of 20,000 Rhenish florins, who was provided by the citizens of Brzeg.

Two years later (1547), Duke Frederick II died and George inherited the Duchy of Brzeg, who included the towns of Oława, Strzelin, Niemcza, Kluczbork, Byczyna, Wołów and Ścinawa. In all, Barbara bore her husband seven children, two sons and five daughters.

Duke George II died on 7 May 1586, after forty-one years of marriage. In his will, he left the Duchy of Brzeg to his wife as her dower with the full sovereignty over this land until her own death. The duchies of Oława and Wołów were received by her sons Joachim Frederick and John George as co-rulers, and because Barbara was the duchess in Brzeg, both brothers decided to settle his residence in Oława.

After Barbara's death, Brzeg was inherited by her only surviving son Joachim Frederick, because her other son, John George, already died in 1592.

References

External links

Genealogical database by Herbert Stoyan

1527 births
1595 deaths
House of Hohenzollern
Piast dynasty
Daughters of monarchs